Richard C. Clark (January 5, 1944September 4, 1988) was an American basketball player in the American Basketball Association (ABA).

Born in Findlay, Ohio he played collegiately for the Eastern Kentucky University.

He played for the Minnesota Muskies (1967–68) and Houston Mavericks (1968–69) in the ABA for 58 games.

External links

1944 births
1988 deaths
American men's basketball players
Basketball players from Ohio
Eastern Kentucky Colonels men's basketball players
Houston Mavericks players
Minnesota Muskies players
People from Findlay, Ohio
Point guards
Shooting guards